Makowsky is a surname. Notable people with the surname include:

Alexander Makowsky (1833–1908), Austrian botanist, geologist and paleontologist
Bruce Makowsky, American real estate developer
Gene Makowsky (born 1973), Canadian politician
Johann Makowsky (born 1948), Hungarian-born Swiss mathematician
Lucas Makowsky (born 1987), Canadian speed skater